Bimbaji Bhonsle was the youngest son of Raghoji I Bhonsle, the Maratha ruler of Nagpur. Bimbaji was the ruler of Chhattisgarh on behalf of the raja of Nagpur. However, he was only nominally subordinate to the raja of Nagpur, as he had a separate army and court with ministers at his capital of Ratanpur.

Career
Bimbaji was the youngest son of Raghoji I Bhonsle, the Maratha ruler of Nagpur. Bimbaji married Anandibai, who continued to wield her influence in Chhattisgarh after her husband's death and caused small-scale unrest. Raghoji I Bhonsle appointed him as the governor of Chhattisgarh in 1758. When Mohan Singh, the Haihayavanshi ruler of Chhattisgarh on behalf of Nagpur learnt about this, he prepared an army at Raipur to oppose Bimbaji but suddenly fell ill and died. Thus Bimbaji faced no opposition in assuming rule of the region. 

Bimbaji maintained order in Chhattisgarh militarily by great oppression and rapacity. Bimbaji used to collect excess revenue to maintain the government, as well as to pay an annual tribute of Rupees 7,000 to Nagpur. But this had disadvantageous effects as the revenue of the region dropped considerably from 8 lakhs. 
Bimbaji was constantly quarrelling with his nominal overlord at Nagpur who was also his brother. He was always chafing at his isolated and politically unimportant position. He reigned in Chhattisgarh from 1758 to 1787. After his death, the suba system was adopted in the region which lead to even more unrest in the future and even the Pindaris plundered the region.

References

People of the Maratha Empire
18th-century Indian royalty